Johnny Paul (29 January 1899 – 20 January 1981) was a Scottish footballer who played as an inside forward.

Career
John Campbell "Johnny" Paul played locally for Torpedo Athletic. After four seasons with Port Glasgow Athletic, Alex Raisbeck signed Paul in August 1922 for Bristol City. Paul moved to Taunton Town in November 1930, but a serious knee injury ended his football career
soon afterwards. Paul was a leading bowls player and landlord of the "Coopers Arms" in Ashton Gate and the "Angel Inn" in Taunton.

Honours
with Bristol City
Football League Third Division South winner: 1926–27

References

1899 births
1979 deaths
Footballers from Glasgow
Scottish footballers
Association football inside forwards
English Football League players
Port Glasgow Athletic F.C. players
Taunton Town F.C. players
Bristol City F.C. players